"The Hands You're Holding Now" is a song written by Marty Robbins. In 1961, American country artist, Skeeter Davis, recorded and released the song as a single for RCA Victor.

"The Hands You're Holding Now" was recorded in March 1961 at the RCA Victor A Studio in New York, New York, United States. The song was released as a single in March 1961 also, peaking at number eleven on the Billboard Magazine Hot C&W Sides chart later in the year. The song was not originally issued onto an album.

Chart performance

References 

1960 songs
Skeeter Davis songs
Songs written by Marty Robbins
Song recordings produced by Chet Atkins
1961 singles
RCA Victor singles